John Richard Easton (March 22, 1933 – December 2, 2019) was a Canadian actor, best known for his portrayal of Brian Hammond in the 1970s BBC serial The Brothers.

Life and career
Easton was born in Montreal, Quebec, Canada, the son of Mary Louise (née Withington) and Leonard Idell Easton, a civil engineer. He started acting in a children's theatre group before moving, at the age of seventeen, to Ottawa to work in a weekly repertory theatre.

Easton has performed in a number of stage productions, as well as various film roles. He also had television guest appearances on Doctor Who, L.A. Law, Frasier, and Ed.

In 2002, Easton starred in the title role in a three-part documentary, Benjamin Franklin, on PBS.
Between 2005 and 2011, Easton appeared as Benjamin Franklin in a series of commercials and videos about Freemasonry, produced for the Grand Lodge of Massachusetts A.F. & A.M.

On October 18, 2006, while performing Tom Stoppard's The Coast of Utopia on stage during the show's second preview at the Lincoln Center Theater's Vivian Beaumont Theater, Easton suffered a heart attack and collapsed.  His heart stopped beating, but after co-star Martha Plimpton realised that Easton's fall was serious and asked the audience if a doctor was present, a stagehand stepped up to perform CPR. An ambulance was called and Easton was revived with defibrillation. He underwent a procedure to correct a heart arrhythmia, briefly delaying the opening of the play, in which he played a central role. He made a full recovery and returned to the play soon after the incident.

In 2008, Easton was inducted into the American Theater Hall of Fame.

In 2011, Easton made a guest appearance in the second season of Boardwalk Empire, appearing as Jackson Parkhurst in the episode, "Gimcrack & Bunkum".

One of his last notable appearances in media was as the voice of Nigel, the eccentric movie fanatic in the game Grand Theft Auto V.

Easton died on December 2, 2019 at the age of 86.

Filmography

Film

Television

Stage

 Hamlet - Claudius (1969 Lyceum Theatre production)
 The Invention of Love - A. E. Housman, aged 77 (2001)
 Noises Off - Selsdon Mowbray (2001 Royal National Theatre production)
 Henry IV, Parts 1 and 2 - Henry IV (2003 Lincoln Center production)
 The Coast of Utopia - Alexander Bakunin/Leonty Ibayev/Stanislaw Worcell (2006 Lincoln Center production)
 Elling - Alfons (2010 Broadway production)

Video Games

Awards

References

External links

1933 births
2019 deaths
Canadian male film actors
Canadian male Shakespearean actors
Canadian male stage actors
Canadian male television actors
Drama Desk Award winners
Male actors from Montreal
Tony Award winners
Canadian expatriates in the United Kingdom